James Smith served as Secretary of State of Kansas from 1879 to 1885. He graduated from Jefferson College in Canonsburg, Pennsylvania in 1857. He was a Republican.

References

Secretaries of State of Kansas
Kansas Republicans
19th-century American politicians
Washington & Jefferson College alumni
Year of birth missing
Year of death missing